The murder of Jermaine Goupall occurred in South London on the evening of 8 August 2017. Jermaine, a 15-year-old student at St. Joseph's College, was stabbed by a group of teenagers in a premeditated attack. This crime is considered to be one of the most prominent cases linking knife crime to drill music, and it is believed that his death was foreshadowed in a drill music video.

Background 
An aspiring architect and engineer, Jermaine Goupall was a 15-year-old student at St. Joseph's College and attended Saturday school at Croydon Supplementary Education Project. He loved his cat, Happy, and was a member of a local swim club, where he was noted for his love of swimming. 

During the summer holidays, after an evening with friends at a cinema, the group was ambushed by masked youths of the CR0 gang armed with knives in the Thornton Heath area of London.

Jermaine was stabbed seven times, with a fatal wound to the femoral artery of his right thigh. Despite efforts from bystanders and emergency services, Jermaine bled to death and was pronounced dead at the scene. The crime occurred less than 100 yards from his home.

He was laid to rest on 29 September, 2017.

Trial 
On 8 January 2018, the trial for Jermaine's murder took place at the Old Bailey. Four out of the five youths were convicted on 14 February 2018, resulting in three of the offenders – Adam Benzahi, Samuel Oliver-Rowland and Junior Simpson – being sentenced to a total of 72 years for premeditated murder.

On the first day of the trial, the court was told that Saskia Haye-Elliot – another youth charged for the murder – said she thought the group were only going to "annoy or irate" members of the CR7 gang by taking videos of them to post on Snapchat and YouTube. Though Jermaine was not a member of the CR7 gang, he was assumed to be a member by the offenders because he lived in the area.

During the trial, Simpson said he was not aware that anyone was hurt until the three other passengers in the car returned. He also denied prior knowledge of a planned attack, stating he was unaware of the presence of knives, masks or balaclavas in the car. All of the offenders stated that they never knew who he was and never had an issue with him. Extensive details about what happened to Jermaine that fatal night were highlighted in court, bringing to light that the offenders were looking for anyone they believed to be in the opposing gang.

Aftermath 
Jermaine's death received international attention and opened a conversation on the impact of drill music and the increase of knife crime across London. Jermaine Goupall's case was influential since it was one of the first cases to highlight YouTube and drill music as evidence for murder. After Jermaine's trial, Director of Public Prosecutions Max Hill stated that "violent social media posts must be used by prosecutors to crack down on gangs." Goupall's death has been a point of reference for calls to ban and sanction music that may initiate a threat of violence.

Jermaine's death is covered in the Channel 5 show Gangland, a show that covers London's gangs and their recruitment of minors. Another documentary which highlighted the murder was the 5Star series When Teens Kill. In addition, the BBC produced two videos covering Jermaine's death.

In April 2018, the Goupall family criticized YouTube because videos by the gang that killed Jermaine were still accessible.
   
In October 2019, Jermaine's father, Stanley Goupall, was invited on the Victoria Derbyshire show, along with other men who had lost a son or brother to knife crime. The episode included a short film entitled "Men who lost loved ones to knife crime", which was nominated for a BAFTA Award in 2020.

His family have started a knife crime awareness charity, the JFJ Foundation, who work in educating young people across the United Kingdom about the dangers of knife and gang violence.

References 

2001 births
2017 deaths
Deaths by stabbing in London
August 2017 crimes in Europe
2017 murders in the United Kingdom